Dick Hughes (1931 — 2018) was an Australian jazz pianist, singer and journalist.

Hughes earned two ARIA Award nominations for Best Jazz Album, in 1987 for The Last Train For Casablanca Leaves Once In A Blue Moon and in 2010 alongside his daughter Christa Hughes with Twenty First Century Blues. He also contributed a track (with Dick Hughes' Famous Five) to Jazz Live At Soup Plus which was nominated for the same award in 1989.

Hughes was born in Melbourne in 1931, the only son of Richard Hughes, a journalist, and his wife, May Hughes née Bennett. He developed an interest in jazz early in life and became president of the Melbourne University Rhythm Club in 1950. In 1952 he relocated to London for three years where he started working as a journalist, working for ABC, Frank Packer, News Limited and Fairfax community newspapers before retiring in 2014.

Hughes was a pianist and singer and played regularly around Sydney's jazz scene and played in multiple bands such as The Port Jackson Jazz Band and Ray price Quartet before first performing solo in 1973. He formed Dick Hughes' Famous Five and the released an album, Dick Hughes Looks Back & Around, in 1977.

In 1997 Hughes started presenting a jazz show, Speak Easy and Swing Hard, on 2MBS-FM.

Hughes married Fay in 1962 and together they had three daughters, Vashti, Christa and Stephanie.

Discography

Albums

Awards and nominations

ARIA Music Awards
The ARIA Music Awards is an annual awards ceremony that recognises excellence, innovation, and achievement across all genres of Australian music. They commenced in 1987. 

! 
|-
| 1987
| The Last Train For Casablanca Leaves Once In A Blue Moon
| Best Jazz Album
| 
|rowspan="2"| 
|-
| 2010
| Twenty First Century Blues
| Best Jazz Album
| 
|-

References

External links
Biographical cuttings on Dick Hughes, containing one or more cuttings from newspapers or journals — Trove, National Library of Australia

1931 births
2018 deaths
20th-century Australian musicians
Australian pianists
20th-century Australian journalists
Musicians from Melbourne
People from Brighton, Victoria
Musicians from Sydney